Craig Murray Spearman (born 4 July 1972) is an English-New Zealand former cricketer who played 19 Tests and 51 One Day Internationals for New Zealand from 1995–2001.

He took his education from Kelston Boys High School, Auckland and then to Massey University, New Zealand.

Domestic career
However, after meeting with fellow New Zealander, John Bracewell, he was asked to play for the team he was coaching, Gloucestershire County Cricket Club. Spearman immediately became a favourite in Bristol, when he hit a century in his first match.

In 2004 he hit 341 against Middlesex at Gloucester. His innings contained 40 fours and six sixes and was the highest ever score by a Gloucestershire batsman, beating the record of WG Grace. Since then he has continued to score runs and has gone on to add two more double centuries.

During a game against Oxford in 2005 he hit 34 runs off an over. In 2006 he became just the 4th player from his county to score a century in both innings against Northamptonshire. He finished the year with 1370 runs in the Championship. In 2009, he made only six Championship appearances with 206 runs at 22.88, and at the end of the year agreed to be released from his contract.

International career
A right-handed opening batsman, Spearman made his international debut for New Zealand in a Test Match in December 1995 against Pakistan at Christchurch. He was never able to secure his spot in the side and only scored one Test hundred, an innings of 112 against Zimbabwe. He was, however, a member of the New Zealand squad for the 1996 Cricket World Cup. After giving up on his international career, he moved to England in 2001 to pursue a career in banking.

References

External links
 

1972 births
Living people
Auckland cricketers
Central Districts cricketers
Cricketers at the 1996 Cricket World Cup
Gloucestershire cricketers
New Zealand One Day International cricketers
New Zealand Test cricketers
New Zealand cricketers
New Zealand emigrants to the United Kingdom
English cricketers